Tre Fiori Football Club, also known simply as Tre Fiori FC (Italian: "Three Flowers"), is a semi-professional football club based in Fiorentino, San Marino. The club, formed in 1949, has been awarded 8 national championship titles and 8 national cup titles, making them the most successful clubs in the history of San Marino football. In 2018 Tre Fiori was the first team from San Marino to qualify for the next round of a UEFA competition, winning 3–1 against Bala Town F.C. on aggregate in the preliminary round of the UEFA Europa League. Tre Fiori currently hold the record for most goals scored in European competition by a Sammarinese team: eight goals. They currently play in the Campionato Sammarinese di Calcio. The club colours, reflected in their crest and kit, are yellow and blue.

S.P. Tre Fiori are currently playing in the highest Sammarinese league, Campionato Sammarinese di Calcio, where they have played the majority of the seasons during their existence. The club was most successful during the 1990s when they won three Sammarinese championships and two Trofeo Federale titles. The club first won Campionato Sammarinese di Calcio in 1988 and took their latest title in 2020. S.P. Tre Fiori have long-standing rivalries with several other clubs; the most notable of these is with neighbours F.C. Fiorentino.

History

Early years (1985–1996)
Società Polisportiva Tre Fiori was founded at the castle of Fiorentino in 1949. The club first won the Campionato Sammarinese di Calcio in 1988 winning on penalties (6-5p) against S.S. Virtus in the play-off finals after a 3–3 draw. In 1989, S.P. Tre Fiori struggled to defend their title and battled against relegation from the Campionato Sammarinese di Calcio. In 1991, S.P. Tre Fiori lost the championship play-off final 1–0 to S.C. Faetano but won the Trofeo Federale that year. In 1992, after a 1–1 draw to F.C. Domagnano the club lost the national cup, Coppa Titano, on penalty shootouts (4-2p). From 1993 till 1995, Tre Fiori dominated the league by winning the championship play-off finals three times in a row. The club was most successful during the 1990s when they won three Sammarinese championships and two Trofeo Federale titles.

1997–2007
After the league being split into two divisions called Girone, in 1998 and 2000, Tre Fiori only succeeded twice to the play-offs losing on both the occasions. In 1998, the team was defeated 1–2 by S.S. Folgore/Falciano in the championship play-off finals and in 2000 the team were eliminated from the play-off semi-finals losing 1–2 to S.S. Virtus. In 2001, Tre Fiori were runners-up of Coppa Titano losing 1–0 to F.C. Domagnano. In the 2003–2004 season, Tre Fiori missed out on to the third position to qualify for the championship play-offs and finished fourth, three points behind S.S. Virtus. In the 2006–2007 season, Tre Fiori reached the finals of the championship play-off but lost 4–0 to S.S. Murata.

Success and European football (2008–present)
On May 29, 2009, S.P. Tre Fori defeated A.C. Juvenes/Dogana 3–1 in a penalty shootout, winning the championship play-offs and qualifying for the UEFA Champions League. On July 1, S.P. Tre Fiori had their first experience in a UEFA Champions League fixture, contesting a first qualifying round tie against UE Sant Julià from Andorra. The home game of the two-legged tie was played at Montecchio and resulted in a 1–1 draw between the two sides. However, S.P. Tre Fiori lost (4–5) on penalties in the away leg of the competition as UE Sant Julià progressed into the second round.

On April 29, 2010, S.P. Tre Fiori won the Coppa Titano for the sixth time after coming from behind to beat S.P. Tre Penne 2–1 in the final thanks to an extra-time winner from veteran striker Sossio Aruta. On May 25, Tre Fiori won 2–1 against S.C. Faetano in the championship play-off semi-final and will face Tre Penne in the final round of the competition. On May 31, Tre Fiori secured their sixth championship title after winning 2–1 to Tre Penne in the championship play-off final. On June 30, S.P. Tre Fiori contested in the first qualifying round of the UEFA Champions League tie against FK Rudar Pljevlja from Montenegro. The home game of the two-legged tie was played at Stadio Olimpico in Serravalle and resulted in a 3–0 defeat for Tre Fiori. However, S.P. Tre Fiori lost 4–1 in the away leg of the competition as FK Rudar Pljevlja qualified for the second round. On November 24, Tre Fiori won the national super cup, Trofeo Federale, for the first time in 17 years by defeating Tre Penne 1–0 in the final.

On May 11, 2011, Tre Fiori won their seventh league title by defeating Tre Penne 1–0, with the goal scored by Alessandro Giunta, in the final of the championship playoffs thereby reaching the first qualifying round of the 2011–12 UEFA Champions League. After winning the title, manager Floriano Sperindio left the club and was replaced by player-manager Paolo Tarini. On June 28, Tre Fiori were drawn against Valletta F.C, from Malta. In the home game of the two-legged tie of the first qualifying round of 2011–12 UEFA Champions League held at Stadio Olimpico in Serravalle Tre Fiori lost 3–0.

On July 5, 2018, Tre Fiori became the first Sammarinese club to win a European tie when they defeated Bala Town from Wales 3–1 on aggregate in the preliminary round of 2018–19 UEFA Europa League qualifying.
On June 13 2022, former San Marino National Team player and record goalscorer Andy Selva was appointed manager. On July 7, 2022, following a 1–0 win against Fola Esch, Tre Fiori became the first Sammarinese club to win a European away game. The Ultras followed up their win in Luxembourg with a 3–1 victory at home in the second leg, securing a 4–1 aggregate win and qualification to the second qualifying round for the first time in club history, where they played Faroese side B36. The Faroese side proved too strong for Tre Fiori over the two legs and won by an aggregate score of 1–0, thus bringing the European adventure to an end.

Honours
League
Campionato Sammarinese di Calcio
Winners (8): 1987–88, 1992–93, 1993–94, 1994–95, 2008–09, 2009–10, 2010–11, 2019–20
Runners-up: 1990–91, 1997–98, 2006–07

Cups
Coppa Titano
Winners (8): 1966, 1971, 1974, 1975, 1985, 2009–10, 2018–19, 2021–22
Runners-up: 1986, 1992, 2001, 2020–21
Trofeo Federale
Winners: 1991, 1993, 2010, 2011
Runners-up: 1988, 1992, 1995, 2007
Super Coppa Sammarinese
Winners: 2019, 2022

European record

Current squad

Club Officials
S.P. Tre Fiori
President: Marino Casali
Club Secretary: Giacomo Benedettini
Club Treasurer: Enzo Conti
Sporting Director: Aster Casali
Directors: Amici Mauro, Sandro Della Valle, Giuseppe Ceccoli, Giuliano Moraccini, Pier Marino Canti & Giacomo Benedettini
Coaching and Medical Staff
Manager: Luca Borgagni
Technical Director: Giorgio Leoni
Fitness coach: Francesco Galli
Masseurs: Giacomo Mancini

Managerial history

 Floriano Sperindio (2009–2011)
 Paolo Tarini (2011–2012)
 Altin Lisi (2016)
 Gori Massimo (2017)
 Matteo Cecchetti (2017–2022)
 Andy Selva (2022–present)

References

External links
Federazione Sammarinese Giuoco Calcio 

 
1949 establishments in San Marino
Association football clubs established in 1949
Football clubs in San Marino
Former Italian football clubs
Fiorentino